John Houston,  (1 April 1930 – 27 September 2008) was a Scottish painter.

Houston was born in Buckhaven, Fife, raised in nearby Windygates, and educated at Buckhaven High School and Edinburgh College of Art. An early career as a semi-professional footballer with Dundee United F.C. was ended by a knee injury.

Houston taught at Edinburgh College of Art between 1955 and 1989. He painted landscapes in an expressionist style. His works are on display at many Scottish art galleries. He was elected to the Royal Scottish Academy in 1972 and was accorded a retrospective at the Scottish National Gallery of Modern Art in 2005.

Houston received an Honorary Doctorate from Heriot-Watt University in 2004

Personal life
He was married to the painter Dame Elizabeth Blackadder until his death.

References

External links

 Work in National Galleries of Scotland, nationalgalleries.org; accessed 19 May 2021.

1930 births
2008 deaths
Scottish landscape painters
Alumni of the Edinburgh College of Art
Officers of the Order of the British Empire
People educated at Buckhaven High School
People from Buckhaven
Scottish footballers
Dundee United F.C. players
Scottish scholars and academics
Expressionist painters
Royal Scottish Academicians
Place of death missing
Association footballers not categorized by position